Wiege der Finsternis is the first studio release of the German folk metal band Finsterforst. It was recorded at the Iguana Studios with the help of a drum machine, as the band did not have a drummer at the time.

Track listing

Personnel

 Band members
 Marco Schomas - vocals and twelve-string guitar
 Johannes Joseph - accordion
 Tobias Weinreich - bass
 Sebastian Scherrer - keyboards
 Simon Schillinger - guitar

Guest musicians

 Nefti - tin whistle

References

Encyclopaedia Metallum
Metal Storm

2006 albums
Finsterforst albums